Plaza de España, also known simply as Plaza España, is a diminutive open space in Intramuros, Manila, Philippines formed by the intersection of Andres Soriano Avenue, Solana Street and Muralla Street. It is a triangular "square" which features a monument to King Philip II of Spain after whom the Philippines was named. The square is one of 47 parks and plazas in the City of Manila maintained by the city's Park Development Office in partnership with the Intramuros Administration. It is surrounded by the Aduana Building, the BPI Intramuros building which replaced the old Santo Domingo Church destroyed during World War II, and the Banco Filipino condominium building built on a portion of the old Ayuntamiento de Manila.

In the early Spanish colonial period, the square was known simply as Plaza Aduana. It was renamed to Plaza de los Martires de la Integridad de la Patria or simply Plaza de Martires in 1897 after the Spanish soldiers who died during the Philippine Revolution. It was in 1902 during the American colonial period when the plaza came to be known by its present name.

The Intramuros Administration began restoring the plaza in 1982. In 1998, the monument to King Philip II was erected in the center of the plaza. It was inaugurated in 2000 during the state visit of Queen Sofía as part of the celebration of the Philippine Centennial.

See also
 Philippines–Spain relations

References

Espana
Buildings and structures in Intramuros